The 129th district of the Texas House of Representatives contains parts of Harris County. The current Representative is Dennis Paul, who was first elected in 2014.

References 

129